Kian Tehran Football Club was an Iranian football club based in Tehran, Iran. It was founded by Sadri Miretemadi and established in the 1950s. In 1989, it was purchased by Abdollah Soufiyani and became known as Poora F.C.

Honours 
Iran Championship Cup:

 Winners (1): 1964
Tehran hazfi cup:

 Winners (1): 1986

References

Football clubs in Iran
Defunct football clubs in Iran
Association football clubs disestablished in 1989
Sport in Tehran
1989 disestablishments in Iran
1950s establishments in Iran
Sports clubs established in the 1950s